Schizophrenia is a primary psychotic disorder, whereas, bipolar disorder is a primary mood disorder which can also involve psychosis. Both schizophrenia and bipolar disorder are characterized as critical psychiatric disorders in the Diagnostic and Statistical Manual of Mental Disorders fifth edition (DSM-5). However, because of some similar symptoms, differentiating between the two can sometimes be difficult; indeed, there is an intermediate diagnosis termed schizoaffective disorder.

While reported and observed symptoms are a main way to diagnose either disorder, recent studies use the advanced technology like magnetic resonance imaging (MRI) scans to try to understand the biology of mood and psychotic disorders. Through MRIs, psychiatrists can see specific structural differences in the brains of people with schizophrenia and bipolar disorder. These differences include volume of gray matter, neuropathological size differences variations and cortical thickness, which are associated with cognitive differences on tests. These differences may sometimes be seen throughout the lifespan of the diseases and often occur soon after the initial episode. 

In treating the bipolar disorder and schizophrenia, there are several paths that psychiatrists and psychologists take, some are similar and others are different. However, there are a few conflicts regarding the medical and therapeutic treatments considering the long-term affects and relapse issues in treating both disorders.

Cause and epidemiology 
Both bipolar disorder and schizophrenia appear to result from gene–environment interaction. Evidence from numerous family and twin studies indicates a shared genetic etiology between schizophrenia and bipolar disorder. Researchers found a combined heritability for bipolar disorder and schizophrenia of approximately 60%, with environmental factors accounting for the remainder. Genetic contributions to schizoaffective disorder appear to be entirely shared with those contributing to schizophrenia and mania.

Bipolar I disorder and schizophrenia each occur in approximately 1% of the population; schizoaffective disorder is estimated to occur in less than 1% of the population.

Schizophrenia 
Schizophrenia is caused by a combination of genetic and environmental factors. Research illustrates that schizophrenia is hereditary and is more likely to strike those who carry particular genes. It is believed that those who are susceptible to the disorder are affected by something in their environment. According to research, alteration in the concentrations of specific chemicals in the brain may also contribute to schizophrenia. Among the 1% of the population affected by this disorder, it is recorded that men are more susceptible than women to being impacted. The disorder typically shows symptoms during adolescence.

Bipolar disorder 
There is no conclusive evidence as to what triggers it, but genetic and environmental factors are both being considered as probable causes.  It is believed that genetic factors contribute a role in its development. However, not everyone with a family history of bipolar disorder develops the disorder. According to research, people with specific genes are more likely to develop the disorder. Stress, for example, can also precipitate the onset of bipolar disorder.

Signs and symptoms

Schizophrenia

Biological 
Patients with schizophrenia have abnormal brain activities which include changes in brain structure or function and abnormal levels of neurotransmitters. These changes may be associated with abnormal social or emotional functioning.

Grey Matter 
To be exact, patients with schizophrenia lose the volume of the grey matter in both hemispheres of the brain specifically in the left thalamus and the right caudate. Furthermore, the grey matter loss extends in to the cerebrum, parahippocampal gyrus and hippocampus. However, the gray matter increases in the temporal and parietal lobes along with the anterior cerebellum. The only region in which the volume increases for gray matter is within the right cerebellum, an area that contributes to the cognitive, affective, perceptual, and other deficits seen in schizophrenia.

Neuropathological 
MRI studies found that schizophrenia is associated with significantly smaller amygdala volume compared to healthy controls.

Behavioral 
Includes withdrawal from social interaction, disorganized speech or behavior, and abnormal motor behaviors. Disorganized speech can include rambling, incoherence, or abruptly switching between topics. People who have schizophrenia may also have delusions or hallucinations. Delusions are false beliefs not supported by evidence—for example, believing that you are being followed or watched or possessing special abilities or powers. Hallucinations are the perception of seeing, hearing, or feeling things that are not present.

Bipolar disorder

Biological 
Unlike schizophrenia, bipolar disorder has very little differences for gray matter volume. Overall, there is no difference in brain tissue volumes between bipolar patients and healthy control patients. 

However, some research has observed that patients with mood disorders had abnormalities including cortical tissue and subcortical regions of brain. Left anterior lesions, whether cortical or subcortical predicts high level of depression in patients suffering from mood disorders. Both the left cortical and subcortical showed a significant relationship between the severity of depression and the location of the lesion in regard to the frontal lobe.

Behavioral 
Behavioral symptoms of patients with bipolar disorder include changes in mood, activity levels, and behavior. Bipolar disorder patients may be delighted during a manic episode and extremely sad during a depressive episode. They may also experience changes in their level of activity. They may be highly active during a manic episode and then extremely inactive during a depressive episode and exhibit behavioral changes. They may engage in behaviors they would not normally engage in during a manic episode, such as excessive spending.

Treatment 
While there is no cure for either condition, effective treatments can help people manage their symptoms and live productive lives.

Most treatments are designed to control symptoms and make them more tolerable due to low rates of complete remission for both disorders and poorly understood and under-researched change mechanisms.  Treatments for these disorders include medication, psychotherapy, rehabilitation, and electroconvulsive therapy.

Medication 
Medication is the cornerstone of treatment for both bipolar disorder and schizophrenia. Antipsychotic medications are the most commonly prescribed for both conditions. Antipsychotics work by helping to regulate the levels of certain chemicals in the brain that are involved in mood and thinking. Moreover, mood-stabilizers, such as lithium, are the primary medication treatment for bipolar disorder.

Furthermore, second generation antipsychotics (dopamine antagonist and serotonin antagonist) medications may also be used for bipolar disorder, often in combination with antidepressant medications (which typically increase serotonin availability). Antipsychotics (usually second generation but also first generation) are the major class of medications used to treat schizophrenia.

Side effects 
Common side effects of antipsychotic medications include dry mouth, weight gain, drowsiness, and constipation. Some antipsychotic medications can also cause a temporary worsening of symptoms known as akathisia.

Psychotherapy 
Psychotherapy is a treatment for patients with both disorders. They guide the patients in their thoughts, and use communication or behavioral work as a means of healing. The most common and effective type of therapy is Cognitive behavioral therapy (CBT) that can help people manage their symptoms and improve their overall functioning. It aids people identify and change negative thinking and behavior patterns. CBT is used to treat both bipolar disorder and schizophrenia.

Families of the affected also benefit from this treatment, as they can sit on sessions and talk to the therapist as well. Other type of therapy that can be helpful for people with bipolar disorder and schizophrenia include family therapy, psycho-education, and support groups.

Rehabilitation 
Rehabilitation is one of several psychosocial treatments for schizophrenia. It involves social and job-skills training to improve an individual's ability to function in society.

Electroconvulsive therapy 
Electroconvulsive therapy (ECT) may be used to treat bipolar disorder when other treatments are ineffective or when medication would be dangerous because of another medical condition.

See also 
 Kraepelinian dichotomy
 Psychotic depression
 Schizoaffective disorder

References

External links 
 
 

Bipolar disorder
Schizophrenia
Medical comparisons
Psychiatry controversies